Quercus vaseyana (also called Vasey oak) is a species of tree in the beech family. It grows in northern Mexico  (Chihuahua, Coahuila, and Nuevo León) and in the US state of Texas.

Q. vaseyana is a shrub or small tree up to 10 metres (33 feet) tall. The bark is brown.

References

External links

vaseyana
Plants described in 1883
Oaks of Mexico
Flora of Texas